Zwrot (meaning "The Term or The Phrase") is the main and largest Polish magazine in the Czech Republic, chief magazine of the Polish minority in Zaolzie. It appears monthly, with a circulation of 1,600 (2019). Published by the PZKO (The Polish Cultural and Educational Union), it is financially supported by the Ministry of Culture of the Czech Republic. The editorial staff is housed in Czeski Cieszyn (Český Těšín). The current editor-in-chief is Halina Szczotka.

History 

Since 2 March 1947 until 20 November 1949 Głos Ludu newspaper published monthly a literary section called Szyndzioły. In December 1949 this section was transformed into Zwrot magazine. The first issue of Zwrot appeared on 24 December 1949. The first logo of the magazine was designed by artist Rudolf Żebrok. Together with Franciszek Świder they were the first illustrators of Zwrot. Zwrot had from the beginning a literary character. Content includes historical studies, essays, poetry, prose, art, educational and community issues, and factual reports. The circulation of Zwrot was in the past far higher, but it is historically declining along with the demographic drop in the Polish population. From 1949 to 1967 it appeared in A4 format, from 1967 to 2006 in A5 format, and from 2007 it appears in A4 full-colour format.

Circulation

Editors-in-chief 
 Paweł Kubisz (1949–1958)
 Tadeusz Siwek (1958–1964)
 Jan Rusnok (1964–1969)
 Tadeusz Chrząszcz (1970–1972)
 Eugeniusz Suchanek (1972–1976)
 Bronisław Bielan (1976–1979)
 Kazimierz Kaszper (1979–1981)
 Piotr Przeczek (1983–1990)
 Jan Rusnok (1990–1992)
 Władysław Młynek (1992–1993)
 Dorota Havlík (1993–1995)
 Elżbieta Stróżczyk (1995–2006)
 Kazimierz Kaszper (2007-2012)
 Halina Sikora-Szczotka (2012-2017)
 Izabela Kraus-Żur (2018)
 Halina Szczotka (2018-)

See also
 List of magazines in the Czech Republic

Footnotes

References

External links
 Official website 

1949 establishments in Czechoslovakia
Magazines published in the Czech Republic 
Magazines established in 1949
Monthly magazines
Polish minority in Zaolzie
Polish-language magazines